Jack Kane (1 April 1911 – 10 October 1999) was a Scottish politician and social campaigner who served as Lord Provost of Edinburgh from 1972 to 1975. He was Edinburgh's first Labour Lord Provost.

Life

He was born on 1 April 1911 in Addiewell in West Lothian, the youngest of three brothers in a coal-mining family. The family moved to Stoneyburn, He was educated at Bathgate Academy.

The family then moved to Niddrie Mains in south Edinburgh. From 1936 he worked as a librarian.

In 1938 he served his first role as a town councillor, representing Liberton. In the Second World War he served in the Royal Artillery. After the war he represented Craigmillar.

In 1962 he helped the parents of Peffermill Primary School found the Craigmillar Festival Society. In 1969 he received an OBE for his services to the local community.

In May 1972 he was elected Lord Provost of Edinburgh, succeeding Sir James Wilson McKay. In 1974 owing to his policitical beliefs he declined a knighthood in the New Year's Honours List, the first Lord Provost to so decline. As a result of him declining the knighthood, the Crown no longer offers an automatic knighthood to the Lord Provost of Edinburgh as it previously did.

He accepted an honorary doctorate (LLD) from the University of Edinburgh in 1976.

From 1975 he served as a councillor for Lothian Regional Council representing Niddrie/Craigmillar. He retired on 30 March 1976.

In 1983 he became Chairman of Age Concern in Scotland.

He died on 10 October 1999, and was cremated at Warriston Crematorium,

Recognition

The Jack Kane Sports Centre in Craigmillar is named in his memory. His portrait by Alexander Goudie is held by City of Edinburgh Council.

Family

He was married to Anne. They had two daughters and a son.

References

1911 births
1999 deaths
People from West Lothian
People educated at Bathgate Academy
Lord Provosts of Edinburgh
British Army personnel of World War II
Royal Artillery personnel
Scottish military personnel